Never Frae My Mind is a 2006 album by Ed Miller.

Track listing
 The Rollings Hills of the Borders (Matt McGinn/Ed Miller) - 4:05
 David and Goliath (Robin Laing) - 3:54
 The Yew Tree (Brian McNeill) - 4:20
 Across the Hills of Home (Eric Bogle/James MacArthur/Ed Miller) - 3:12
 The Spanish Lady (traditional, Arr. Ed Miller)- 3:12
 Mary Hamilton (traditional) - 5:56
 The Wild Geese (Jim Reid/Violet Jacob) - 3:13
 Daughters and Sons (Tommy Sands) - 4:28
 The Smith's a Gallant Fireman (J. Scott Skinner/Harrison) - 3:31
 The Gallawa Hills (traditional)- 3:25
 Sleepytoon (George S. Morris) - 3:09
 My Old Martin Guitar (Alex Campbell, tune traditional) - 3:21
 Come Fill up Your Glasses (Peggy Seeger, tune traditional) - 4:14

Never Frae My Mind
Never Frae My Mind